A Place Like This is Robbie Nevil's second album, released in 1988. The album contains two tracks that became hit singles in the US.  The first was "Back on Holiday" (US Billboard #34, Cash Box #30) followed by "Somebody Like You" (US Billboard #63).

Track listing
 "Somebody Like You" 4:16 (Richard Feldman, Robbie Nevil, Jeff Pescetto)
 "Back on Holiday" 3:59 (Nevil, David Paul Bryant, Steve Dubin)
 "Mary Lou" 4:11 (Nevil, Brock Walsh)
 "Getting Better" 3:53 (Nevil, Walsh)
 "Love and Money" 2:55 (Nevil, Walsh)
 "Love Is Only Love" 4:44 (Mark Mueller, Nevil)
 "Here I Go Again" 3:49 (Mueller, Nevil)
 "Holding On" 3:09 (J. P. Charles, Nevil, Duncan Pain)
 "Too Soon" 3:06 (Nevil, Walsh)
 "Can I Count on You" 4:51 (Clyde Lieberman, Nevil)
 "Dreams" 4:37 (Nevil, John Van Tongeren)

Production
 Produced by Robbie Nevil (Track 2), Chris Porter (Tracks 1, 3, 5-10) & Tom Lord-Alge (Track 4)
 Tracks 1, 3, 6-10 recorded by Chris Porter; Track 2 recorded by Alan Meyerson; Track 4 recorded by Tom Lord-Alge; Track 5 recorded by Ernie Sheesley & Chris Porter
 Additional Engineering: Chris Fuhrman & Will Rogers
 Assistant Engineer: Claudio Ordenes
 Mixing: Chris Porter
 Mastering: Brian Gardner at Bernie Grundman Mastering (Hollywood, CA)
 Art Direction: Henry Marquez
 Design: Carol Chen
 Photography: Steve Danelian
 Project Coordination: Lisa Marie
 Management: Ron Weisner Entertainment

Personnel
 Robbie Nevil - lead vocals, all guitars, additional keyboards on tracks 1, 6, 11
 John Van Tongeren (tracks 1, 3, 6, 9, 10), Tommy Faragher (track 2), Robbie Kondor (track 4), "The Trash Band" (track 5) - keyboards
 Billy Childs (track 7) - acoustic piano
 Richard Hurwitz (track 7), Casey Young (track 8) - Synclavier
 Nathan East (tracks 1, 2, 3, 6), Robby Kilgore (track 4), Larry Gales (track 7), "The Cook" (track 8) - bass guitar
 Neil Stubenhaus (track 4) - fretless bass
 John Van Tongeren (tracks 1, 3, 6, 10), "The Trash Band" (track 5) - synth bass
 Steve Dubin (tracks 1, 2, 5, 10), John "J.R." Robinson (tracks 3, 6), Jimmy Bralower (track 4), Bobby Colomby (track 7), J.P. Charles (track 8) - drums
 Paulinho Da Costa (tracks 1, 3, 9, 10), John "J.R." Robinson (tracks 1, 10), Bashiri Johnson (tracks 2, 4), John Van Tongeren (track 6) - percussion
 Lenny Pickett (track 2), Danny Pelfrey (tracks 3, 5, 6), Brandon Fields (track 4) - saxophone
 Alfie Silas (tracks 1, 3, 6, 8, 10), Chris Thompson (tracks 1, 5, 6, 8, 10), Jeff Pescetto (tracks 1, 6, 10), Laura Hunter (tracks 1, 5, 6, 8, 10), Voncielle Faggett (tracks 1, 3, 5, 6, 8, 10), Cindy Mizelle (track 2), Frank Floyd (track 2), Lotti Golden (track 2), Tommy Faragher (track 2), Tommy Funderburk (tracks 3, 5, 10) - backing vocals

Notes

1988 albums
Manhattan Records albums
Robbie Nevil albums
Albums produced by Tom Lord-Alge